Glen Eden Intermediate School (G.E.I.S) is a state Co-Educational Intermediate school located in the suburb of Kaurilands in Auckland, New Zealand. The roll fluctuates around 1050 student and there is an enrolment scheme (school zone) in place. In-zone suburbs include Titirangi, Laingholm, most of Glen Eden and nearby Konini and Kaurilands. Maree Stavert has been principal since the retirement of Terry Hewetson in 2015.

History and organisation
The school was originally divided into eight syndicates named after New Zealand trees. Each syndicate had four classrooms, (except the "Manuka" syndicate which held five). In 2010, the syndicates were replaced with four "mini schools", Te Henga, Karekare, Muriwai and Piha named after local West Coast beaches. All classes are combined Year 7 and Year 8 with elected student councillors who attend weekly school council meetings. The school has provision for programmes for students who need enrichment.

In 2001 the school opened a technology block which as of 2022 teaches one mini-school every day and has eight classes: Food Technology, Design Technology, Sound Arts, Dramatic Arts, Visual Arts, Hard Materials, Textiles Technology, and Video Production.  At the start of 2019, Textiles Technology was replaced by Enviro Technology. The Video Production room is also the headquarters of "Cactus", the school's daily TV show which only broadcasts throughout the school. The school previously had a radio station, T.N.T (Totally Not Television) which opened in 2010 but is longer active.

A gymnasium that had "full-sized basketball and netball courts, volleyball and badminton courts" was opened in 2001. The gym opening coincided with the school's 40th anniversary, and the former board of trustees chair Brian Clayton noted that "the gym is a legacy to present and future students and the community...[and]...It's a testimony to a number of things that reflect the school." An auditorium, added later, was merged with the administration block. There is a daily school fitness programme consisting of road runs, aerobics, and a variety of activities held on the artificial turf and backcourt.

Learning environment
The school teaches to the NZ Curriculum. Some classes in the school have a modern learning environment with "collaborative, flexible classroom(s) that can evolve to meet the needs of a rapidly changing society ...[and are]...different to the traditional style of rows of desks facing the teacher." Students are supported to use devices for online learning and encouraged to bring their own device.

Sport
Each year the school holds events in cross country, athletics and swimming, with students competing in their year levels. Students can try out to go to sports camps and for NZ AIMS Games, a major sporting competition which is held every September in Tauranga.
School teams compete in the Netball Waitakere competition. A variety of teams also participate in the local inter-school zone sports competitions.

The Arts
Every second year the school holds a major school production. In 2018 it was Hairspray Junior and in 2020, Aladdin.
There is also a concert band and two rock bands - one for each year level - and these, along with the annual talent show, are widely supported by the school community.
Large Pasifika and kapa haka groups are well attended and play an important cultural role in the school.

Community
Every year students from the school participate in the World Vision New Zealand 40 Hour Famine to raise funds to support children, families and communities to overcome poverty and injustice.

Demographics
The school was last visited by The Education Review Office (ERO) on 11 November 2016.  At that time, Glen Eden Intermediate School had 995 students, of whom 55% were male and 45% female. There were 21 international students and the ethnic make up of the school was as follows: 53% New Zealand European (Pākehā), 16% Māori, 6% Samoan, Asian and Indian at 5% each and 10% as other ethnicity.

Notable alumni
Rose McIver
Caleb Clarke
Michael Fatialofa

Gallery

References

External links
[Official website|http://www.geis.school.nz/]
Education Review Office
Fundraising for child refugees 2016
John Catmull remembered 2011
Working with The Peace Foundation

Intermediate schools in Auckland
Waitākere Ranges Local Board Area
Educational institutions established in 1961
1961 establishments in New Zealand
Schools in West Auckland, New Zealand